The bicolor angelfish (Centropyge bicolor) is a marine species of fish, easily recognizable by its yellow tail, yellow front half of their body, and blue rear with blue patterns above and around the eye. Other names of this angelfish include: Pacific rock beauty, oriole angelfish, oriole dwarf angel, blue and gold angel, and two-colored angel. The life expectancy in the wild varies greatly, depending on location, and ranges between 5 and 13 years. These fish tend to grow to a maximum of 6 inches in length. The larval stages lasts approximately 32 days.

Distribution and habitat

The bicolor angelfish species is most commonly found in the Indo-Pacific region: including East Africa, southern Japan, Australia, and Fiji.  They live at a depth range from 1 to 25 meters, most commonly on reef slopes, coral areas, lagoons, and near drop-off areas.

Ecology
A typical bicolor angelfish diet consists of small crustaceans, such as brine and mysis shrimp, as well as tunicates, corals, sponges, worms, algae, and sometimes clams. This is a non-migratory species that lives in harems with a single linear hierarchy based on size.  Mature adults are identified based on size. Males and females have no color distinction.

Reproduction
Male bicolor angelfish visit the homes of females at dusk to mate. One male may visit one or multiple females per night to spawn. A female will scatter her eggs, and a male will release sperm that will fertilize the egg. Females, however, can only spawn a maximum of once per day. Higher-ranking females have been found to spawn more frequently than lower-ranked females.

They live in harems, meaning several female share one male for mating. Most harems of this species consist of an average of 7 females, ranked in order of size, who mate with one male. The male is the dominant individual of the group, with each female decreasingly ranked based upon decreasing size. They are protogynous hermaphrodites, meaning if the male is removed or dies, the highest ranking female will undergo a sex change. This sex change lasts 18–20 days total.

Behavior
Centropyge bicolor tend to be moderately aggressive, both to members of other species and members of their own species—even their own group. The male spends most of his time guarding his territory from predators, intruding members of other species, but mostly against another harem. This territory tends to be a maximum of 200m2 and encompasses the home ranges of all females within the group. Females are only aggressive towards lower-ranking members of their own group, in order to maintain their current rank.

In captivity C. bicolor have been observed to act as facultative cleaner fish. It seems unlikely that they show this behaviour in the wild.

In aquaculture
Because bicolor angelfish are classified as aggressive fish, they require a larger tank size, at least 75 gallons. They do not survive well in captivity and are not well suited for a reef aquarium. They are best suited for a tank consisting of coral, rocks and plants. Tanks with the most hiding spaces are best, as they like to move from one hiding place to another. The best water temperature for fish in captivity is typically between 72-78F. An optimal pH level is between 8.1 and 8.4. The level of care these fish require is moderate. These fish will survive best if there are no other fish species present within the same tank. It is recommended that bicolor angelfish in captivity be fed algae, shrimps, worms, and spirulina flakes.

References

External links
 Bicolor Angelfish at Centropyge.net 
 Bicolor Angelfish at Fishlore.com
 

Bicolor angelfish
Articles containing video clips
Fish described in 1787